Reportaje ("Report News") is a 1953 Mexican film. The film brought together an extraordinary ensemble cast of the most important stars of the Golden Age of Mexican cinema and was held for charitable purposes for the A.N.D.A (Asociación Nacional de Actores) of México.

The film is divided in 6 chapters around a principal storyline. It was released in a special presentation in the 1954 Cannes Film Festival.

Plot
The owner of a daily paper wants to find the most important news on New Year's Eve. Therefore, he decides to send his top reporters to strategic points in Mexico City.

Chapter 1: The Hospital
One of the reporters arrives at the hospital and finds his wife about to give birth. Upon entering the hospital, he witnesses a number of peculiar cases.

Cast
 Roberto Cañedo
 María Elena Marqués
 Columba Domínguez
 Carmen Montejo
 Esther Fernández
 Ernesto Alonso
 Miroslava
 Miguel Torrúco
 Julio Villarreal
 Amanda del Llano
 Ramón Gay

Chapter 2: The Police Station
The Head of a police station is forced to deal with several comedic cases which involve rather peculiar characters.

Cast
 Carlos López Moctezuma
 "Clavillazo"
 Tin Tan
 Marcelo Chávez
 Meche Barba
 Irma Torres
 Wolf Rubinskis

Chapter 3: The House of a rich man
The reporter shows up at a party hosted by one of the city's richest men, who is about to propose to his fiancee. However, a sudden malaise makes evident that he does not have much time left.

Cast
 Pedro Infante
 Carmen Sevilla
 Domingo Soler
 Carmelita González
 Armando Silvestre
 Manolo Fábregas

Chapter 4: The Show center
Several stars trying to get ahead in a Show Center. In the middle of the performance, a rich man is blackmailed by two peculiar thieves.

Cast
 Libertad Lamarque
 Pedro Vargas
 Lola Flores
 Andres Soler
 Fernando Soler
 Pedro Lopez Lagar
 Joaquín Pardavé
 Luis Aldás

Chapter 5: The Divorce
The owner of the Daily returns home, where his beautiful wife asks for a divorce. The couple begins to remember details of their happy years.

Cast
 Dolores del Río
 Arturo de Córdova

Chapter 6: The Hotel
In a hotel room, a couple of young stars are having a fight: the man (a singer) is unwilling to get up the bed. To his surprise, a particularly beautiful woman shows up.

Cast
 María Félix
 Jorge Negrete

Details
Renowned Mexican comedian, Cantinflas, refused to act in the film without salary -apparently the other stars did perform without pay. 
Mexican actor, Pedro Armendáriz, was announced as a cast member in several magazines at the time; however, he does not appear in the film.

External links
 
 Reportaje at the Cinema of Mexico site of ITESM. 

1953 films
1950s Spanish-language films
1953 comedy films
Estudios Churubusco films
Films directed by Emilio Fernández
Mexican comedy films
Mexican black-and-white films
1950s Mexican films